The 1980 UCF Knights football season represented the University of Central Florida (UCF) as an independent during the 1980 NCAA Division III football season. Led by second-year head coach Don Jonas, the Knights compiled a record of 4–4–1, including the programs only tie, against . UCF played their home games at Orlando Stadium in downtown Orlando, Florida.

Schedule

References

UCF
UCF Knights football seasons
UCF Knights football